XHELI-FM is a Mexican college radio station owned by the Universidad Vasco de Quiroga, a Catholic university in Morelia, Michoacán, Mexico. It broadcasts on 98.1 FM.

History
XHELI received its permit in July 2013. The station signed on in March 2015, with an opening ceremony including a formal blessing by Archbishop Alberto Suárez Inda. In September 2017, the IFT authorized a power and class increase to 15 kW.

References

Radio stations in Michoacán
University radio stations in Mexico
Radio stations established in 2015
2015 establishments in Mexico